James Frank Bishop  is an Australian doctor and the Chief Medical Officer of Australia between 2009 and 2011.

Bishop graduated from University of Melbourne with a Bachelor of Medicine, Bachelor of Surgery in 1972. He was awarded a Fulbright scholarship and spent three years with the National Institutes of Health in the United States. He later practiced at the Peter MacCallum Cancer Centre in Melbourne and after founded the Sydney Cancer Centre at Royal Prince Alfred and Concord Hospitals.

In his role as Chief Medical Officer, Bishop advised the Australian government on its response to the 2009 swine flu pandemic. As CMO, Bishop also looked to focus on prevention measures relating to diet, obesity and tobacco use.

He later became the executive director of the Victorian Comprehensive Cancer Centre and the chair of cancer medicine at the University of Melbourne.

Bishop was made an Officer of the Order of Australia in the 2008 Queen's Birthday Honours for "service to medicine, particularly in the field of cancer treatment and research and through the development of innovative policy, improved public awareness and service delivery programs".

Notable contributions 
Bishop has led several medical initiatives in Australia. The following subsections outline two campaigns that have helped change social attitudes towards cancer, in both financial and health terms.

Dark Side of Tanning Campaign 
“The ‘Dark Side of Tanning’ (DSOT) mass media campaign was developed in 2007 to influence attitudes related to tanning”. Dr Bishop was involved in its creation through his role at the Cancer Institute NSW. The messages of the campaign were distributed using many forms of media such as billboard advertising.

Amongst 15- to 29-year-olds in Australia, melanoma is the most common type of cancer. Further, "in 2008, there were 3,591 new cases of melanoma in NSW (2,127 in males and 1,464 in females) accounting for 10 per cent of all cancers". In the paper, “Exposure to the ‘Dark Side of Tanning’ skin cancer prevention mass media campaign and its association with tanning attitudes in New South Wales, Australia”, it was highlighted that there was a misunderstanding about the side-effects of tanning, mainly misconceptions about the association of a tan with a healthy lifestyle outweighed the health concerns.

The campaign was first aired in the summer of 2007/2008 and was run during the same seasonal period until the summer of 2010/2011. It “centred on three television commercials (referred to as ‘Girl’, ‘Footy’ and ‘Surfer’, respectively) featuring a range of ‘tanner moments’—scenes that aimed to build personal relevance by featuring actors from the target audience”. Moreover, the state governments of Victoria, Queensland, South Australia and Western Australia obtained the licensing rights to use the campaign.

Awards
 2010: earned an international Sulzberger Institute sun safety award at the sixty-eighth annual meeting of the American Academy of Dermatology.
 2010: presented with a Gold Australian Advertising Effectiveness (Effie) award in the Government, Corporate and Social Services category.

Quit campaigns 
These marketing campaigns formed part of the NSW Tobacco Action Plan 2005-09 which “set a target of 1 percent reduction per annum in adult smoking prevalence between 2005 and 2009”. This was to be achieved by changing individuals’ smoking habits by “invoking cognitive or emotional responses” through various media publications. These messages formed a vital part of controlling tobacco consumption.  

The first media release by the Cancer Institute NSW was on the 18th of April 2006 and was centered around promoting the services offered by the Quitline.

Dr Bishop had this to say when commenting on the cost of smoking in the New South Wales community and how the quit campaigns can alleviate some of the issues:

“We think Quit campaigns are very effective. Collins and Lapsley have done an economic review of the effects of smoking which shows that about $6.6 billion a year is spent in New South Wales on smoking-related illness and people dying early—all of the economic effects. We have estimated that as smoking rates drop by 1% a year over a five-year period the economic return to New South Wales would be between $2.3 billion and $5.8 billion. So the money we spend to drop the smoking rate by 1 per cent, which is essentially what we have achieved over the last year, is very effective in terms of health economics”.

Notable positions held and achievements

Roles 

 2011 – present: Professor of Cancer Medicine, The University of Melbourne
 2011 – present: Executive Director, The Victorian Comprehensive Cancer Centre
 2009 – 2011: Chief Medical Officer, Department of Health and Ageing, Australian Government
 2011: National Director of Human Quarantine, Australian Government
 2011: Office of Health Protection, Department of Health and Ageing, Canberra
 2003 – 2011: Honorary Medical Oncologist, Royal Prince Alfred Hospital, Sydney
 2003 – 2009: Chief Cancer Officer for New South Wales
 2003 – 2009: CEO, Cancer Institute NSW
 1995 – 2003: Director, Sydney Cancer Centre, Royal Prince Alfred and Concord Hospitals
 1995 – 2003: Clinical Director, Cancer Services, Central Sydney Area Health Service
 1995 – present: Professor of Medicine, The University of Sydney
 1990 – 1995: Director, Division of Haematology and Medical Oncology, Peter MacCallum Cancer Institute, Melbourne

Academic achievements 

 1972: University of Melbourne, MBBS (Bachelor of Medicine and Bachelor of Surgery)
 1979: Royal Australasian College of Physicians, FRACP (Fellow of the Royal Australasian College of Physicians)
 1979: Royal College of Pathologists of Australia, FRCPA (Fellow of the Royal College of Pathologists, Australia)  
 1989: University of Melbourne, M.D.  (Doctor of Medicine)
 1999: University of Melbourne, MMed (Master of Medicine)

Publications 
2001
 Horvath, L., Boyer, M., Clarke, S., Beale, P., Beith, J., Underhill, C., Stockler, M. and Bishop, J 2001, 'Carboplatin and vinorelbine in untreated locally advanced and metastatic non-small cell lung cancer,' Lung Cancer, vol.32, no.2, pp. 173–178. doi:10.1016/S0169-5002(00)00218-X
Matthews, J., Bishop, J., Young, G., Juneja, S., Lowenthal, R., Garson, O., Cobcroft, R., Dodds, A., Enno, A., Gillett, E. and Hermann, R, et al. 2001, 'Patterns of failure with increasing intensification of induction chemotherapy for acute myeloid leukaemia,' British Journal of Haematology, vol.113, no.3, pp. 727–736. doi:10.1046/j.1365-2141.2001.02756.x
Ong, S., Clarke, S., Bishop, J., Dodds, H. and Rivory, L 2001, 'Toxicity of irinotecan (CPT-11) and hepato-renal dysfunction,' Anti-Cancer Drugs: international journal on anti-cancer agents, vol.12, no.7, pp. 619–625. doi:10.1097/00001813-200108000-00009
Rivory, L., Clarke, S., Boyer, M. and Bishop, J 2001, 'Highly sensitive analysis of the antifolate pemetrexed sodium, a new cancer agent, in human plasma and urine by high-performance liquid chromatography,' Journal of Chromatography B: Analytical Technologies in the Biomedical and Life Sciences, vol.765, no.2, pp. 135–140. doi:10.1016/S0378-4347(01)00406-6
2003
 Millward, M., Boyer, M., Lehnert, M., Clarke, S., Rischin, D., Goh, B., Wong, J., McNeil, E. and Bishop, J 2003, 'Docetaxel and carboplatin is an active regimen in advanced non-small-cell lung cancer: a phase II study in Caucasian and Asian patients,' Annals of Oncology, vol.14, no.3, pp. 449–454. doi:10.1093/annonc/mdg118
2007
 Bishop, J. F., Cotter, T., Perez, D. and Dessaix, A 2007, 'Impact of a graphic health warnings tobacco campaign in Australia,' Journal of Thoracic Oncology, vol.2, no.8, pp. S384-S385. doi:10.1097/01.JTO.0000283241.14454.e3
2008
 Cotter, T., Perez, D. A., Dessaix, A. L. and Bishop, J. F 2008, 'Smokers respond to anti-tobacco mass media campaigns in NSW by calling the Quitline,' NSW Public Health Bulletin, vol.19, no.4, pp. 68–68. doi:10.1071/nb07098
Boyle, P., Anderson, B., Andersson, L., Ariyaratne, Y., Auleley, G., Barbacid, M., Bartelink, H., Baselga, J., Behbehani, K., Belardelli, F. and Berns, A, et al. 2008, 'Need for global action for cancer control,' Annals of Oncology, vol.19, no.9, pp. 1519–1521. doi:10.1093/annonc/mdn426
Tracey, E., Roder, D., Zorbas, H., Villanueva, E., Jelfs, P. and Bishop, J 2008, 'Survival and degree of spread for female breast cancers in New South Wales from 1980 to 2003: implications for cancer control,' Cancer Causes & Control, vol.19, no.10, pp. 1121–1130. doi:10.1007/s10552-008-9177-y
2009
 Bishop, J 2009, 'Managing Pandemic (H1N1) 2009 influenza: A national health response,' Aus. J. Emerg. Manage., vol.24, no.3, pp. 5–6.
Tracey, E. A., Roder, D. M., Francis, J., Zorbas, H. M., Hacker, N. F. and Bishop, J. F 2009, 'Reasons for Improved Survival From Ovarian Cancer in New South Wales, Australia, Between 1980 and 2003 Implications for Cancer Control,' International Journal of Gynecological Cancer, vol.19, no.4, pp. 591–599. doi:10.1111/IGC.0b013e3181a3a436
Tracey, E., Roder, D., Luke, C. and Bishop, J 2009, 'Bladder cancer survivals in New South Wales, Australia: why do women have poorer survival than men?,' BJU Int., vol.104, no.4, pp. 498–504. doi:10.1111/j.1464-410x.2009.08527.x
Bishop, J. F., Murnane, M. P. and Owen, R 2009, 'Australia's Winter with the 2009 Pandemic Influenza A (H1N1) Virus,' New England Journal of Medicine, vol.361, no.27, pp. 2591–2594. doi:10.1056/NEJMp0910445
Stavrou, E. P., Baker, D. F. and Bishop, J. F 2009, 'Maternal smoking during pregnancy and childhood cancer in New South Wales: a record linkage investigation,' Cancer Causes & Control, vol.20, no.9, pp. 1551–1558. doi:10.1007/s10552-009-9400-5
Stavrou, E. P., McElroy, H. J., Baker, D. F., Smith, G. and Bishop, J. F 2009, 'Adenocarcinoma of the oesophagus: incidence and survival rates in New South Wales, 1972–2005,' Medical Journal of Australia, vol.191, no.6, pp. 310–314. doi:10.5694/j.1326-5377.2009.tb02813.x
2010

 Cotter, T., Perez, D., Dunlop, S., Hung, W. T., Dessaix, A. and Bishop, J. F 2010, 'The case for recycling and adapting anti-tobacco mass media campaigns,' Tobacco Control, vol.19, no.6, pp. 514–517. doi:10.1136/tc.2009.035022
 Morrell, S., Perez, D. A., Hardy, M., Cotter, T. and Bishop, J. F 2010, 'Outcomes from a mass media campaign to promote cervical screening in NSW, Australia,' Journal of Epidemiology and Community Health, vol.64, no.9, pp. 777–783. doi:10.1136/jech.2008.084657
 Murray, P., Kerridge, I., Tiley, C., Catanzariti, A., Welberry, H., Lean, C., Sinclair, S., Bishop, J. and Bradstock, K 2010, 'Enrolment of patients to clinical trials in haematological cancer in New South Wales: current status, perceived barriers and opportunities for improvement,' Intern. Med. J., vol.40, no.2, pp. 133–138. doi:10.1111/j.1445-5994.2009.01911.x
 Bishop, J 2010, 'Medical oncology group of Australia cancer achievement award - Cancer, then and now,' Cancer Forum, vol.34, no.1, pp. 31–32.

2011
 Harvey, S. L., Francis, J. E., McBride, A. J., Bishop, J. F. and Phillips, K 2011, 'Medication to prevent breast cancer - too much to swallow?,' Medical Journal of Australia, vol.195, no.11-12, pp. 646–649. doi:10.5694/mja11.10830
Rankin, N. M., Barron, J. A., Lane, L. G., Mason, C. A., Sinclair, S. and Bishop, J. F 2011, 'Psychosocial oncology services in New South Wales,' Australian Health Review, vol.35, no.2, pp. 156–163. doi:10.1071/AH08730
Cotter, T., Hung, W. T., Perez, D., Dunlop, S. and Bishop, J 2011, 'Squeezing new life out of an old Sponge: how to modernise an anti-smoking media campaign to capture a new market,' Australian and New Zealand Journal of Public Health, vol.35, no.1, pp. 75–80. doi:10.1111/j.1753-6405.2010.00654.x
Olver, I. N., Falleiro, S. J., Marson, M. L. and Bishop, J. F 2011, 'A case study of a single ethics committee for multicentre trials,' MEDICAL JOURNAL OF AUSTRALIA, vol.195, no.10, pp. 582–583. doi:10.5694/mja11.10484
2012
 Mauguen, A., Le Pechoux, C., Saunders, M. I., Schild, S. E., Turrisi, A. T., Baumann, M., Sause, W. T., Ball, D., Belani, C. P., Bonner, J. A. and Zajusz, A, et al. 2012, 'Hyperfractionated or Accelerated Radiotherapy in Lung Cancer: An Individual Patient Data Meta-Analysis,' Journal of Clinical Oncology, vol.30, no.22, pp. 2788–2797. doi:10.1200/JCO.2012.41.6677
 Scolyer, R., Bishop, J. and Thompson, J 2012, 'Primary Melanoma of the Lung,' Textbook of Uncommon Cancer, pp. 335–341. doi:10.1002/9781118464557.ch23
2013
 Lueza, B., Mauguen, A., Pignon, J., Rivero-Arias, O. and Bonastre, J 2016, 'Difference in Restricted Mean Survival Time for Cost-Effectiveness Analysis Using Individual Patient Data Meta-Analysis: Evidence from a Case Study,' PLOS ONE, vol.11, no.3, pp. 12-. doi:10.1371/journal.pone.0150032
2016
 Lacey, K., Bishop, J. F., Cross, H. L., Chondros, P., Lyratzopoulos, G. and Emery, J. D 2016, 'Presentations to general practice before a cancer diagnosis in Victoria: a cross-sectional survey,' Medical Journal of Australia, vol.205, no.2, pp. 66–71. doi:10.5694/mja15.01169
 Lueza, B., Mauguen, A., Pignon, J., Rivero-Arias, O. and Bonastre, J 2016, 'Difference in Restricted Mean Survival Time for Cost-Effectiveness Analysis Using Individual Patient Data Meta-Analysis: Evidence from a Case Study,' PLOS ONE, vol.11, no.3, pp. 12-. doi:10.1371/journal.pone.0150032
2017
 Jefford, M., Ward, A. C., Lisy, K., Lacey, K., Emery, J. D., Glaser, A. W., Cross, H., Krishnasamy, M., McLachlan, S. and Bishop, J 2017, 'Patient-reported outcomes in cancer survivors: a population-wide cross-sectional study,' Supportive Care in Cancer, vol.25, no.10, pp. 3171–3179. doi:10.1007/s00520-017-3725-5
2018
 Tran, Q., Ward, A., Lisy, K., Bishop, J. and Jefford, M 2018, 'High proportion of prostate cancer survivors continue to experience a negative impact on quality of life long after diagnosis: Patient reported outcomes for an Australian population-based sample,' Annals of Oncology, vol.29 pp. 2-. doi:10.1093/annonc/mdy300.074 
2019
 Lisy, K., Ward, A., Schofield, P., Hulbert-Williams, N., Bishop, J. and Jefford, M 2019, 'Patient-reported outcomes of sexual and gender minority cancer survivors in Australia,' Psycho-Oncology, vol.28, no.2, pp. 442–444. doi:10.1002/pon.4956
Loring, D. W., Bowden, S. C., Staikova, E., Bishop, J. A., Drane, D. L. and Goldstein, F. C 2019, 'NIH Toolbox Picture Sequence Memory Test for Assessing Clinical Memory Function: Diagnostic Relationship to the Rey Auditory Verbal Learning Test,' Archives of Clinical Neuropsychology, vol.34, no.2, pp. 268–276. doi:10.1093/arclin/acy028

Citations

References 

 Trish Cotter, Wai Tak Hung, Donna Perez, Sally Dunlop, James Bishop. “Squeezing new life out of an old Sponge: how to modernise an anti‐smoking media campaign to     capture a new market”. Australian and New Zealand Journal of Public Health. WILEY-BLACKWELL. 13 January 2011. Retrieved 8 September 2020
 James F Bishop, Trish Cotter,     Donna Perez, Anita Dessaix. “Impact of a graphic health warnings tobacco campaign in Australia”. Journal of Thoracic Oncology. LIPPINCOTT WILLIAMS & WILKINS. 2007. Retrieved 8 September 2020.

Living people
Year of birth missing (living people)
21st-century Australian medical doctors
21st-century Australian public servants
Officers of the Order of Australia
University of Melbourne alumni
Australian health officials
Lung cancer
Integumentary neoplasia
Smoking
Melanoma